The Shenzhen Mosque is a mosque in Futian District, Shenzhen City, Guangdong Province, China.

Architecture
It consists of the main prayer hall, bunker building, ablution room, garden etc. It was constructed with Arabic architecture style.

Transportation
The mosque is accessible within walking distance east of Shangmeilin Station of Shenzhen Metro.

See also
 Islam in China
 List of mosques in China

References

Buildings and structures in Shenzhen
Religious buildings and structures in Guangdong
Mosques in China